Hugh Teesdale (12 February 1886 – 31 March 1971) was an English first-class cricketer active 1906–10 who played for Surrey, Marylebone Cricket Club (MCC) and Oxford University. He was born in Addlestone; died in Hove.

References

1886 births
1971 deaths
English cricketers
Surrey cricketers
Marylebone Cricket Club cricketers
Oxford University cricketers
Alumni of Oriel College, Oxford
H. D. G. Leveson Gower's XI cricketers